A number of ships of the Royal Navy have carried the name HMS Jackdaw, including:

 , a Cuckoo-class schooner sold in 1816
 , a schooner wrecked in 1835

See also
 RNAS Crail (HMS Jackdaw), a stone frigate
 RNAS Dunino (HMS Jackdaw II), a stone frigate

Royal Navy ship names